Mine a Breton Creek is a stream in Washington County in the U.S. state of Missouri. It is a tributary of Mineral Fork.

Mine a Breton Creek took its name from a nearby mine of the same name, which in turn has the name of Francois Azor dit Breton, a pioneer citizen.

See also
List of rivers of Missouri

References

Rivers of Washington County, Missouri
Rivers of Missouri